Monolofo is a village of the Oraiokastro municipality. Before the 2011 local government reform it was part of the municipality of Kallithea. The 2011 census recorded 370 inhabitants in the village. Monolofo is a part of the community of Mesaio.

See also
 List of settlements in the Thessaloniki regional unit

References

Populated places in Thessaloniki (regional unit)